Rhombodera sjostedti is a species of praying mantis in the family Mantidae, found on the Tenimbar Islands of Indonesia.

See also
List of mantis genera and species

References

S
Mantodea of Asia
Insects described in 1930